The iRobot Transphibian is a man-portable, fin-powered AUV and bottom-crawler that can autonomously insert itself into the water and operate in a very shallow area. The fins enable the robot to navigate with 6 degrees of freedom, even in surge, to avoid obstacles and maneuver in tight spaces. In military operations the robot is more usually referred to as a UUV.

The Transphibian can carry a wide array of payloads and is designed for mine detection, harbor defense and surveillance. It employs a hybrid navigation system that allows it to operate in both shallow surf zones and in deeper waters.

The Transphibian was initially developed by the Nekton Corporation in Durham, North Carolina. iRobot acquired Nekton in September, 2008.

References

External links
 iRobot Corporation: Transphibian
 Overview of iRobot's entry into UUV market
 Article on Transphibian while under Nekton development

Unmanned underwater vehicles
IRobot
2000 robots